Misima-Panaeati, also called Misiman, is an indigenous Austronesian language spoken on the islands of Misima, Panaeati, and the islands of the eastern half of the Calvados Chain of Papua New Guinea.

Phonology

Vowels 
Misima-Paneati has five vowel phonemes.

Consonants 
Misima-Paneati has 17 consonant phonemes.

Syllables 
In Misima-Paneati, the following syllable types commonly occur: V, CV, CVC, and VC.

The open syllables V and CV are found in all positions of words, whereas the closed syllables CVC and VC are only found word finally and across morpheme boundaries, with the exception of the following five words:

  – 'feelings'
  – 'centre pole'
  – 'fingernail'
  – 'centre rib of coconut leaf'
  – 'sneeze'

The only monomorphemic consonant clusters that always occur across syllable boundaries are:

Notes

External links 
 Materials on Misima are included in the open access Arthur Capell collections (AC1 and AC2) and the Malcolm Ross collection (MR1) held by Paradisec.

References 
 
 

Subject–object–verb languages
Papuan Tip languages
Languages of Milne Bay Province